The Last Judgment is a 1961 commedia all'italiana film by Italian director Vittorio De Sica. It was coproduced with France.

It has an all-star Italian and international cast, including Americans Jack Palance, Ernest Borgnine; Greek Melina Mercouri and French Fernandel, Anouk Aimée and Lino Ventura.

The film was a huge flop, massacred by critics and audiences when it was released. It was filmed in black and white, but the last sequence, the dance at theatre, is in color.

Plot
At the morning of a normal day of a Naples that begins to hear complex and not always positive effects of the economic boom, a stentorian voice (Nicola Rossi-Lemeni) which seems to come down from heaven announces that "At 18 begins the Last Judgement!".
The announcement is repeated with increasing insistence, first treated with disdain and then more and more frightening. The plot is fragmented into a series of scenarios and stories intertwined: the preparation of the great ball of the Duke to whom all Naples is requested, the struggle to get dressed up in the poorest districts, bored rich you are courting, a husband who accidentally discovers his wife with her lover, a cynical imagine that ekes out a living selling children in America, a young man of good company made the subject of sneers from fierce populace, the unlikely defense of a lobbyist by a wordy lawyer (the by De Sica), and the impact of the increasingly mysterious voice shaking innovation of this human variety. Those who repent too late, he who gives himself to the mad joy, who flaunts a false indifference.
Announced time, the city is impacted by a terrible flood (the mysterious voice that has already passed the stage of sanctions?) After which, with great solemnity, the Last Judgment begins and ends, however, as mysteriously as it is announced. The sun came out, people rushed to the ball of the Duke and soon everything is forgotten, the sound of an ironic "Lullaby", coined shortly before by a hypocritical and false slavery.

Cast
 Alberto Sordi - Merchant of children
 Vittorio Gassman - Cimino
 Anouk Aimée - Giorgio's wife Irene
 Fernandel - The widower
 Nino Manfredi - Waiter
 Silvana Mangano - Letizia Matteoni
 Paolo Stoppa - Giorgio
 Jaime de Mora y Aragón - Ambassador
 Renato Rascel - Coppola
 Melina Mercouri - Foreign lady
 Jack Palance - Matteoni
 Lino Ventura - Giovanna's father
Elisa Cegani - Giovanna's mother
 Vittorio De Sica - Defense lawyer
Ernest Borgnine - the pickpocket
Eleonora Brown - Giovanna
 Jimmy Durante - the big nose man  
 Franco Franchi and Ciccio Ingrassia - the unemployed men
 Domenico Modugno - the singer
 Marisa Merlini - a mother
 Mike Bongiorno - himself
 Akim Tamiroff - the director
 Maria Pia Casilio - the waitress
 Alberto Bonucci - the guest in Matteoni's house
 Lamberto Maggiorani - a poor man

External links 
 

1961 films
Films directed by Vittorio De Sica
1960s Italian-language films
Commedia all'italiana
Films set in Italy
Films set in Naples
1961 comedy films
Magic realism films
Films produced by Dino De Laurentiis
Films with screenplays by Cesare Zavattini
Apocalyptic films
Films scored by Alessandro Cicognini
1960s Italian films